B. Kojo Laing or Bernard Kojo Laing (1 July 1946 – 20 April 2017) was a Ghanaian novelist and poet, whose writing is characterised by its hybridity, whereby he uses Ghanaian Pidgin English and vernacular languages alongside standard English. His first two novels in particular – Search Sweet Country (1986) and Woman of the Aeroplanes (1988) – were praised for their linguistic originality, both books including glossaries that feature the author's neologisms as well as Ghanaian words.

Early life and career
Laing was born in Kumasi, capital of Ghana's Ashanti region, the eldest son and fourth of the six children of George Ekyem Ferguson Laing (an Anglican priest who became the first African rector of the Anglican Theological College in Ashanti) and Darling Egan. Baptized as Bernard Ebenezer, he later stopped using his English Christian name, favouring his African identity instead. After some early education in Accra, Laing in 1957 went to continue his primary and secondary schooling in Scotland, attending Bonhill Primary School and the Vale of Leven Academy in Alexandria, Dunbartonshire.

He graduated from Glasgow University in 1968 with a master's degree, before returning to Ghana with his Scottish wife Josephine and their three children.  Joining the civil service, he remained there until 1979. He subsequently worked for five years as an administrative secretary of the Institute of African Studies at the University of Ghana-Legon and in 1984 became head of Saint Anthony's School in Accra, which had been established by his mother.

Writing
Laing emerged as a poet in the 1970s, with work "occasionally drawing on the techniques of surrealism", but received significant attention only with the appearance his first novel, Search Sweet Country, which was published in 1986 to critical acclaim, and won prizes including the Valco Award and the Ghana Book Award.

Search Sweet Country was reissued by McSweeney's in 2012, with an Introduction by Binyavanga Wainaina. Reviewing it in The Slate Book Review, Uzodinma Iweala writes: "Reading Search Sweet Country is like reading a dream, and indeed at times it feels like the magical landscapes of writers like the Nigerian Ben Okri or the Mozambican Mia Couto. Each page delivers an intense blast of vivid imagery, a world in which landscapes come to life when inanimate objects receive human characterization.... Laing ... is a master stylist, and Search Sweet Country delivers an absorbing, if demanding, world for both its characters and the reader." Publishers Weekly called it an "intricate, beautifully rambling novel ... a compelling and rewarding read", while the reviewer for the Pittsburgh Post-Gazette observed: Search Sweet Country' can be read over and over, continually surprising with a fresh turn of phrase or nuance in character, always engaging, always beautiful. The search is worthwhile."

Laing's second novel, Woman of the Aeroplanes, was published in 1988, and has drawn comparison with the work of Ayi Kwei Armah. Laing published two further novels: Major Gentl and Achimota Wars (1992), which also won a Valco Award in 1993, and Big Bishop Roko and the Altar Gangsters (2006).

His poetry collection, Godhorse was published in 1989. Laing also wrote short stories, one of which – "Vacancy for the Post of Jesus Christ" – was included in The Heinemann Book of Contemporary African Stories (1992; edited by Chinua Achebe and C. L. Innes), and has been described as "a wonderful, surreal piece of allegorical science fantasy".

Later years

Laing lived in Accra and, from 2005, devoted himself full-time to writing.

He died in Ghana aged 70 on 20 April 2017, survived by his first wife and nine children and his second wife and three children. Tributes in The Johannesburg Review of Books noted that he was "painfully underappreciated in his lifetime" and called him "one of the unsung heroes of African fiction".

Awards
 1976: National Poetry Prize Valco Award
 1985: National Novel Prize, Ghana Association of Writers
 1993: Valco Award

Bibliography
 Big Bishop Roko and the Altar Gangsters (novel), Woeli Publishing Services, 2006. 
 Major Gentl and Achimota Wars (novel), Heinemann African Writers Series, 1992. 
 Godhorse (poetry), Heinemann African Writers Series, 1989. 
 Woman of the Aeroplanes (novel), Heinemann, 1988; reissued 2011, with an Introduction by Ellah Allfrey, 
 Search Sweet Country (novel), Heinemann, 1986; 2011, . With an Introduction by Binyavanga Wainaina, McSweeney's Publishing, 2012, .

Further reading
 Brenda Cooper, Magical Reading in West African Fiction: Seeing with a Third Eye, London: Routledge, 1998.
 Arlene A. Elder, Myth, Humor and History in the Fiction of Ben Okri, B. Kojo Laing and Yvonne Vera, Boydell & Brewer, 2009.
 M. E. Kropp Dakubu, "Representations and Transformations in the Fiction of Kojo Laing: The 'Language of Authentic Being' Revisited", Connotations, Vol. 8.3 (1998/99): 357–61.
 Joseph Hankinson, Kojo Laing, Robert Browning and Affiliative Literature: Relational Worlds (Cham: Palgrave Macmillan, 2022).
 Moussa Issifou, "Beyond the Language Debate in Postcolonial Literature: Linguistic Hybridity in Kojo B. Laing's Woman of the Aeroplanes", The Journal of Pan African Studies, vol. 6, no. 5, October 2013, pp. 46–62.
 Francis Ngaboh-Smart, Beyond Empire and Nation. Postnational Arguments in the Fiction of Nuruddin Farah and B. Kojo Laing. Amsterdam/New York, NY, 2004, XXI, 168 pp.
 Francis Ngaboh-Smart, "Science and the Re-representation of African Identity in Major Gentl and the Achimota Wars", Connotations 7.1 (1997/98): 57–79.
 Mary Rohrberger, "Woman of the Aeroplanes", in Frank N. Magill (ed.), Magill's Literary Annual 1991, Englewood Cliffs, NJ: Salem Press, 1991, 2:914–18.

References

External links
 Adewale Maja-Pearce, "Interview with Kojo Laing", in Wasafiri, Vol. 3, Issue 6 & 7, Spring 1987, pp. 27–29. 
 "More Hope More Dust" – poem by Kojo Laing. Poetry Foundation.
 Otosirieze Obi-Young, "Is He African Literature’s Greatest Linguistic Innovator?", Brittle Paper, 10 May 2017.

1946 births
2017 deaths
20th-century Ghanaian poets
20th-century male writers
20th-century novelists
21st-century male writers
21st-century novelists
Alumni of the University of Glasgow
Ghanaian male poets
Ghanaian novelists
Ghanaian short story writers
People from Kumasi